Habibur Rahman (born 18 July 1987) is a Bangladeshi first-class cricketer who plays for Rajshahi Division. He made his Twenty20 (T20) debut on 21 November 2016 playing for Comilla Victorians in the 2016–17 Bangladesh Premier League.

See also
 List of Rajshahi Division cricketers

References

External links
 

1987 births
Living people
Bangladeshi cricketers
Rajshahi Division cricketers
Comilla Victorians cricketers
Place of birth missing (living people)